Dommelsch Brewery is a brewery founded in 1744 in the  village of Dommelen, Netherlands. It is part of the Anheuser-Busch InBev group, and brews Dommelsch Pilsener for the Dutch market.

History
Dommelsch was founded in 1744 in the  village of Dommelen, Netherlands. It was taken over by Brouwerij Artois in 1968, who later became Interbrew,  and then part of the Anheuser-Busch InBev group in 2008.

Besides Dommelsch the brewery also makes Hertog Jan, Jupiler, Leffe and Brahma.

Brewery

The Dommelsch Brewery building is in Dommelen, Netherlands. It was built in 1744.

Brands
It brews its own brand Dommelsch Pilsener, a 5% abv pale lager, for the Dutch market, and the global brand Brahma beer for the European market.

References

External links
Brewery website

InBev brands
1744 establishments in the Dutch Republic
Breweries in the Netherlands
Breweries in North Brabant
Valkenswaard